Bryophila ravula is a moth of the family Noctuidae. It is found in southern and central Europe.

The larvae probably feed on lichen.

Subspecies
Bryophila ravula ravula (Belgium and Germany to Spain, Sicily, the Republic of Macedonia and Bulgaria and from France to Ukraine)
Bryophila ravula grisescens Oberthur, 1918 (Iberian Peninsula)
Bryophila ravula ereptriculoides Boursin, 1952 (Iberian Peninsula)

External links

Fauna Europaea
Lepiforum.de

Cryphia
Moths of Europe
Taxa named by Jacob Hübner